Uchkhoz is a rural locality (a village) in Stepanovskoye Rural Settlement, Kudymkarsky District, Perm Krai, Russia. The population was 68 as of 2010. There are 4 streets.

Geography 
Uchkhoz is located 7 km north of Kudymkar (the district's administrative centre) by road. Zyulganova is the nearest rural locality.

References 

Rural localities in Kudymkarsky District